Buried Seeds is a documentary film, directed by Andrei Severny based on the life journey of Michelin Starred Indian Chef Vikas Khanna.

Synopsis 
Buried Seeds is a timeless story of struggle, passion, willpower, failure and rise shown through Vikas Khanna’s eyes. It recreates his childhood, finding comfort in his grandmother's kitchen and follows the journey of an immigrant enduring overwhelming obstacles and pain in achieving his dreams."

Trailer 
The trailer of the film was released by Andrei Severny and Vikas Khanna at the 70th Cannes Film Festival.

Film locations 
The documentary has been filmed in Amritsar, Vikas's hometown in India, Manipal, where he received formal training in Hotel management and New York, where he currently resides.

Crew 
The film is directed by Andrei Severny, produced by Pooja Kohli, co-produced by Jitendra Mishra and edited by Andrei Severny and Stephen Cardone.

Screening 
The documentary was screened at a special preview screening at the Venice Film Festival 2017 on 6 September, which was complemented by a dinner curated by Khanna himself based on the theme 'Celebrating India'.

TV Premiere and streaming 
Buried Seeds' TV premiere was on National Geographic on August 15, 2021. The film is currently available on Disney+ Hotstar.

References

External links 
 Official website
 
 Film trailer

2019 films
Films about chefs
Films directed by Andrei Severny (filmmaker)
Films shot in New York City
American documentary films
Biographical documentary films
2010s English-language films
2010s American films